The 2003 Central American and Caribbean Championships in athletics were held in St George's, Grenada, between 4–6 July 2003. It was the first time that the country had hosted the competition.

Medal summary

Men's events

Women's events

† = non-championship event

Medal table

Participation

 (6)
 (2)
 (26)
 (18)
 (7)
 (5)
 (5)
 (1)
 (15)
 (8)
 (3)
 (27)
 (6)
 (5)
 (4)
 (30)
 (11)
 (19)
 (6)
 (2)
 (25)
 (12)
 (2)
 (12)
 (1)
 (17)
 (2)
 (12)
 (29)

References

External links
Men Medalists – GBR Athletics
Women Medalists – GBR Athletics
Men's results
Women's results

Central American and Caribbean Championships in Athletics
Central American and Caribbean Championships
Athletic
Athletic
Athletics competitions in Grenada
International sports competitions hosted by Grenada
2003 in Grenadian sport